Cyphocarpa is a genus of flowering plants belonging to the family Amaranthaceae. It is in the Amaranthoideae subfamily.

Its native range is southern tropical (within Angola, Mozambique, Zambia and Zimbabwe) and southern Africa (with Botswana, Namibia, Eswatini) and also parts of South Africa (within the Cape Provinces, Free State, KwaZulu-Natal and the Northern Provinces).

Known species
As accepted by Plants of the World Online:
Cyphocarpa angustifolia 
Cyphocarpa cruciata 
Cyphocarpa resedoides 
Cyphocarpa trichinioides 

It was first described and published in Bot. Jahrb. Syst. Vol.27 on page 42 in 1899.

References

Amaranthaceae
Amaranthaceae genera
Plants described in 1899
Flora of South Tropical Africa
Flora of Southern Africa